The Central Coast's 107.7 Triple M (call-sign: 2GGO) is a commercial radio station based in Gosford, New South Wales, Australia. The broadcast area is the NSW Central Coast, a region that extends from southern Lake Macquarie to the Hawkesbury River.
Originally called 2GO, it was the Central Coast’s first radio station starting on the AM band with 1310, moving to 1323, and the final location on the AM band was 801 (to allow for stereo broadcasting). It later moved to its current frequency of FM 107.7.
Ownership of the station has changed a number of times. For some period it was a part of the WESGO group, being a two-station company comprising 2GO in Gosford and 2WS in Sydney. Currently owned by Southern Cross Austereo, in November 2019 it was rebranded to Triple M.

The original AM transmitter tower complex for 2GO in 1971 was at Ourimbah before moving to Chittaway Point in 1985. In 1992 the station converted to FM (107.7 MHz) with transmitters at Somersby.

Gallery

References

Adult contemporary radio stations in Australia
Radio stations in New South Wales
Radio stations established in 1971
1971 establishments in Australia